Göran Johansson (born 6 November 1941) is a Swedish speed skater. He finished 15th in the 1500 m event at the 1972 Winter Olympics. At the European championships he placed 14–15th in 1971 and 1972.

References

External links
 

1941 births
Living people
Swedish male speed skaters
Olympic speed skaters of Sweden
Speed skaters at the 1972 Winter Olympics
People from Skara Municipality
Sportspeople from Västra Götaland County
20th-century Swedish people